Hydrogenophaga intermedia is a Gram-negative, oxidase-positive bacterium from the Comamonadaceae family. It has the ability to degrade 4-aminobenzenesulfonate.

References

External links
Type strain of Hydrogenophaga intermedia at BacDive -  the Bacterial Diversity Metadatabase

Comamonadaceae
Bacteria described in 2001